Prince Rostislav may refer to:

 Prince Rostislav (Rachmaninoff), a symphonic poem by Sergei Rachmaninoff
 Prince Rostislav (poem), a poem by Alexey Konstantinovich Tolstoy